Celso Lafer (born August 7, 1941) is a Brazilian jurist, full professor of Philosophy of Law at University of São Paulo, twice former foreign minister and a former commerce minister. He is of Lithuanian Jewish heritage.

Education

Lafer has a Bachelor in Law from University of São Paulo, a Master's and a Ph.D. in Political Science from Cornell University and a habilitation in Public International Law from University of São Paulo.

Work

Lafer worked for the administrations of Fernando Collor de Mello as Foreign Minister and for Fernando Henrique Cardoso as Foreign Minister and Commerce Minister. He is a member of the Brazilian Academy of Sciences since 2004. He is a member of the Brazilian Academy of Letters since 2006, occupying the chair that belonged to Miguel Reale, Professor of Philosophy of Law at University of São Paulo, and President of the São Paulo Research Foundation (FAPESP), one of the main funding agencies for scientific and technological research in Brazil.

References

External links

Living people
1941 births
Brazilian diplomats
Brazilian philosophers
Cornell University alumni
Members of the Brazilian Academy of Letters
Recipients of the Great Cross of the National Order of Scientific Merit (Brazil)
Government ministers of Brazil
Academic staff of the University of São Paulo
Place of birth missing (living people)
Brazilian people of Lithuanian-Jewish descent
20th-century Brazilian politicians
21st-century Brazilian politicians
Foreign ministers of Brazil